Counties 1 Southern South (formerly known as Southern Counties South) is a level 7 league in the Rugby Football Union South West Division, the rugby union governing body for South West England, part of the Rugby Football Union.  When league rugby first began in 1987 it was a single league known as Southern Counties but since 1996 the division was split into two regional leagues: Southern Counties North and Southern Counties South.  Counties 1 Southern South currently sits at the seventh tier of club rugby union in England and primarily features teams based in Dorset and Wiltshire.

The league champions at the end of the season are promoted to Regional 2 South Central while the runners up face the runners up from Southern Counties North for their place.  Relegated teams tend to drop to either Counties 2 Dorset & Wilts North, Counties 2 Dorset & Wilts South or Counties 2 Dorset & Wilts Central depending on geographic placement. As of the 2022–23 season, with the RFU league restructuring, lower XVs are able to play in Counties 1 Southern South.

2021–22

Thatcham finished 11th in 2019–20 but were level transferred to Southern Counties North for the current season.

2020–21
Due to the coronavirus pandemic the season was cancelled.

2019–20

2018–19

2017–18

2016–17

Season 2015–16

The 2015–16 Southern Counties South consists of twelve teams; four each from Dorset, Somerset and Wiltshire. The season started on 12 September 2015 and ended on 23 April 2016.

Participating teams
Eight of the twelve teams participated in last season's competition. The 2014–15 champions Swanage & Wareham and runners up Salisbury (who won their playoff game) were promoted to the South West 1 East while Supermarine and Corsham were both relegated to Dorset & Wilts 1 North.  Wootton Bassett were level transferred from Southern Counties North.

League Table 2015–16

Teams 2014–15 
Bradford-on-Avon
Corsham
Dorchester
Frome
Midsomer Norton
North Dorset
Salisbury (relegated from South West 1 East)
Sherborne
Supermarine
Swanage & Wareham
Walcot
Wimborne

Teams 2013–14 
Corsham
Dorchester
Frome
Ivel Barbarians
North Dorset (relegated from Tribute South West 1 West)
Sherborne
Swanage & Wareham
Trowbridge
Walcot
Wells
Wimborne

Teams 2012–13 
Corsham
Devizes
Dorchester	
Frome
Oakmeadians
Sherborne
Supermarine
Trowbridge
Walcott
Weymouth
Wimborne
Wootton Bassett

Teams 2009–10 
Bradford-on-Avon
Corsham
Devizes
Dorchester	
Frome
Ivel Barbarians
Minety
North Dorset
Oldfield Old Boys
Sherborne
Tadley
Wimborne

Original teams
When league rugby began in 1987 this division (known as Southern Counties) contained the following teams:

Aylesbury
Banbury
Bletchley
Bracknell 
Marlow
Oxford Marathon
Oxford Old Boys
Redingensians
Swindon
Wimborne
Windsor

Southern Counties South Honours

Southern Counties (1987–1993)

Originally Southern Counties North and Southern Counties South were combined in a single division called Southern Counties.  It was a tier 7 league with promotion up to South West 2 and relegation down to either Berks/Dorset/Wilts 1 or Bucks/Oxon 1.

Southern Counties (1993–1996)

At the end of the 1992–93 season the top six teams from London Division 1 and the top six from South West Division 1 were combined to create National 5 South.  This meant that Southern Counties dropped from a tier 7 league to a tier 8 league for the years that National 5 South was active.  Promotion continued to South West 2 and relegation down to either Berks/Dorset/Wilts 1 or Bucks/Oxon 1.

Southern Counties South (1996–2000)

Restructuring by the RFU at the end of the 1995–96 season saw Southern Counties split into two separate leagues, Southern Counties North and Southern Counties South, which reverted to tier 7 leagues due to the cancellation of National 5 South.  Promotion from Southern Counties South was now to the new South West 2 East while relegation was now only to Berks/Dorset/Wilts 1 (currently split into Dorset & Wilts 1 North and Dorset & Wilts 2 South).

Southern Counties South (2000–2004)

Southern Counties South remained a tier 7 league, with promotion continuing to South West 2 East.  However, the transfer of Berkshire clubs from the Dorset/Wilts leagues to the Bucks/Oxon leagues, meant that relegation was now to Dorset & Wilts 1 (formerly Berks/Dorset/Wilts 1).

Southern Counties South (2005–2009)

Southern Counties South remained a tier 7 league, with promotion continuing to South West 2 East, while a further restructuring of the Dorset/Wilts leagues meant that relegation was now to either Dorset & Wilts 1 North or Dorset & Wilts 1 South.

Southern Counties North (2009–present)

Despite widespread league restructuring by the RFU, Southern Counties South continued as a tier 7 league, with promotion to South West 1 East (formerly South West 2 East) and relegation to either Dorset & Wilts 1 North or Dorset & Wilts 1 South.

Promotion play-offs
Since the 2000–01 season there has been a play-off between the runners-up of Southern Counties North and Southern Counties South for the third and final promotion place to South West 1 East. The team with the superior league record has home advantage in the tie.  At the end of the 2019–20 season Southern Counties North teams have been the most successful with twelve wins to the Southern Counties South teams seven; and the home team has won promotion on thirteen occasions compared to the away teams six.

See also
 South West Division RFU
 Dorset & Wilts RFU
 English rugby union system
 Rugby union in England

Number of league titles

Wimborne (4)
Banbury (2)
Bournemouth (2)
Frome (2)
Redingensians (2)
Sherborne (2)
Swanage & Wareham (2)
Trowbridge (2)
Amersham & Chiltern (1)
Chippenham (1)
Devizes (2)
Dorchester (1)
Grove (1)
Ivel Barbarians (1)
Marlow (1)
North Dorset (1)
Oakmeadians (1)
Reading Abbey (1)
Royal Wootton Bassett (1)
Salisbury (1)
Tadley (1)
Walcot (1)
Wells (1)

Notes

References 

7
Rugby union in Dorset
Rugby union in Wiltshire
Rugby union in Somerset
Sports leagues established in 1987
1987 establishments in England